Cao Xibin (born February 1963) is a Chinese engineer and professor and doctoral supervisor at Harbin Institute of Technology.

Biography
Cao was born in Zhaodong, Heilongjiang, in February 1963. He earned a bachelor's degree in 1985, a master's degree in 1988, and a doctor's degree in 1991, all from Harbin Institute of Technology. In October 1991 he pursued advanced studies in Russia, where he graduated from Samara National Research University. 

After graduating from Harbin Institute of Technology, Cao taught at the university, where he was dean of the School of Astronautics in June 2009 and its vice-president in February 2019.

Honours and awards
 November 22, 2019 Member of the Chinese Academy of Engineering (CAE)

References

1963 births
Living people
People from Zhaodong
Harbin Institute of Technology alumni
Academic staff of Harbin Institute of Technology
Engineers from Heilongjiang
Members of the Chinese Academy of Engineering